Danay Aguilar García (born July 5, 1984) is a Cuban-born actress and model. She is best known for her roles as Sofía Lugo on Fox's drama series Prison Break (2007–2009) and Luciana Galvez on AMC's horror drama series Fear the Walking Dead (2016–present).

Career
Her first role for the public was playing the lead role in Maria Antonia, by Eugenio Hernandez Espinosa, in a Havana theatre production when she was 17. In the U.S., García started learning English by studying with teachers and dialect coaches. She began booking commercials. She began ballet studies at the Debby Allen Dance Academy, while continuing her acting studies. García booked her first U.S. feature film role playing opposite Marisa Tomei in Danika.
 
García moved on to CSI: NY and CSI: Miami roles, feature film From Mexico With Love, then landed her big break as series regular, Sofía Lugo, in the Golden Globe Award winning Fox television series, Prison Break. During the 2007 writer's strike, García made it through multiple rounds of auditions for the Bond girl, Camille Montes, in MGM and Eon Productions’ Quantum of Solace, but had to be dropped due to a clause in her Fox contract.
 
After Prison Break, she played the principal guest role of Anna in A&E’s series The Cleaner series, and later appeared in the feature film Rehab. García has worked as a co-writer and co-creator for TV and film projects. García was next cast as Coqui in the Fina Torres’ helmed drama, Liz en Septiembre, which shot on location in the Caribbean Islands around Venezuela, before winning the lead role of Monica in the U.S.-Brazilian co-production, Man Camp, her first significant work in a comedy.

Since 2016, García has portrayed Luciana Galvez on the AMC horror drama series Fear the Walking Dead. She guest-starred in an episode of Hawaii Five-0 in 2017.

Filmography

Film

Television

Video games

References

External links

1984 births
Living people
Cuban expatriates in the United States
Cuban film actresses
Cuban female models
People from Havana
21st-century Cuban actresses